The SPAD S.G1 and SPAD S.G2 were French single seat tractor biplanes of ca 1915/16, following similar arrangements to the SPAD S.A2 family with the propeller and engine buried in the fuselage and a pod suspended in front of the engine. A single SPAD S.A-1 was converted with a small circular section pulpit nacelle mounting a mock-up of a fixed forward-firing machine-gun and smaller wings. 

At least one SPAD S.A-2 was converted to carry three fixed forward-firing machine-guns by the Imperial Russian Air Service in a similar fashion to the S.G.

Specifications (S.G)

References

G2
Aircraft first flown in 1915
1910s French fighter aircraft
Biplanes
Single-engined tractor aircraft